Ed Mitzen is an American entrepreneur, business executive and philanthropist. He is the founder and CEO of Fingerpaint Marketing, and also the co-founder of the non-profit organization Business for Good. Prior to founding Fingerpaint, Mitzen co-founded of the ad agency Palio, which was sold to inVentiv Health in 2006.

Early life and education 
Mitzen grew up in the Voorheesville, New York. He attended Syracuse University, where he earned a bachelor's degree in biology. Mitzen also attended the University of Rochester's Simon Business School where he earned a Master of Business Administration.

Career 
Mitzen worked as a pharmaceutical representative and served as the vice president of product management at Cardinal Health, before founding the consulting business, Creative Healthcare Solutions, in 1997. In 1999, he founded the advertising agency Palio in Saratoga Springs, New York. After selling the company to inVentiv Health in 2006, Mitzen served in various roles until leaving to found the advertising and marketing firm Fingerpaint in 2008. By 2016, Fingerpaint had more than 150 employees with locations in Albany, New York, Columbus, Ohio, Conshohocken, Pennsylvania, and Scottsdale, Arizona. Fingerpaint's notable clients include DreamWorks, General Electric, Emma Willard School, Celgene and Ferring Pharmaceuticals, amongst others.

In 2021, Mitzen and his wife personally donated $4 million to pay down the student loan debt of all Fingerpaint employees, completely eliminating 83 of 131 people's loans.

Business for Good 
In October 2020, Mitzen co-founded The Business for Good Foundation with his wife Lisa. The 50(c)(3) non-profit operates multiple businesses in the Greater Capital Region that offer living wages and healthcare benefits to employees, and donates all profits back to local charitable causes. The foundation also assists organizations like Shelters of Saratoga to help provide affordable living to low-income residents.

In 2021, Business for Good donated $5.4 million to 25 local non-profit organizations. The foundation also provides support and financial assistance to entrepreneurs starting businesses, and development support for existing, growing businesses.

In 2022, Business For Good received an honorable mention in Fast Company’s World Changing Ideas Awards. In May 2022, the foundation made donated $1 million to the three known living survivors of the 1921 Tulsa Race Massacre.

Personal life 
Mitzen and his wife, Lisa, reside in Saratoga Springs. The couple has donated to Code Blue, a program designed to house homeless during cold winter days and nights, since 2012. In 2017, they donated funds to build a 6,500-square foot homeless shelter in Saratoga Springs.

From 2015 to 2020, Mitzen served on the board of directors for Double H Ranch, and was elected to Syracuse University's Board of Trustees in May 2022.

References

External links 
 
 Business for Good website
 Fingerpaint website

Living people
Year of birth missing (living people)
American marketing businesspeople
Businesspeople from New York (state)
People from Voorheesville, New York
People from Saratoga Springs, New York
Syracuse University College of Arts and Sciences alumni
University of Rochester alumni